The Dying Grass is a 2015 novel by William T. Vollmann. The novel concerns the Nez Perce War of 1877.

References

2015 American novels
Postmodern novels
Novels set in the 1870s
Nez Perce War
Fiction set in 1877
Viking Press books